Group C of the Copa América Centenario consisted of Mexico, Uruguay, Jamaica, and Venezuela. Matches began on 5 June and ended on 13 June 2016. All times are EDT (UTC−4).

Mexico and Venezuela advanced to the quarter-finals.

Teams

Notes

Standings

In the quarter-finals:
The winner of Group C, Mexico, advanced to play the runner-up of Group D, Chile.
The runner-up of Group C, Venezuela, advanced to play the winner of Group D, Argentina.

Matches

Jamaica vs Venezuela
The two teams had met in six previous occasions, all of them being friendlies. Their last encounter was on 27 March 2015 at the Montego Bay Sports Complex, which Jamaica won 2–1.

Mexico vs Uruguay
The two teams had met in nineteen previous encounters, the latest being a 2011 Copa América group stage match won by Uruguay with a lone goal by Álvaro Pereira.

Before the game, the stadium played the Chilean national anthem instead that of Uruguay. Tournament organizers later apologized for the incident.

Uruguay vs Venezuela
The two teams had met in twenty-eight previous occasions, the latest being a 2014 FIFA World Cup qualifying match held at the Polideportivo Cachamay in Puerto Guayana in 2013, won by Uruguay with a lone goal scored by Edinson Cavani. Their last Copa América meeting was a 4–1 win for Uruguay in the quarterfinals of the 2007 edition.

Mexico vs Jamaica
The two teams had met in eighteen previous occasions, the latest being the 2015 CONCACAF Gold Cup Final, won by Mexico 3–1. This marked the first time both teams faced each other in a competitive match outside of CONCACAF official competitions.

Mexico vs Venezuela
The two teams had met in ten previous occasions, the latest being a friendly played in 2012, which Mexico won 3–1. The friendly was held at the NRG Stadium, the same venue of this Copa América Centenario encounter. Their last Copa América meeting was a 1999 group stage match, also won by Mexico 3–1.

Uruguay vs Jamaica
The two teams had met in four previous occasions, the last being Jamaica's debut in the previous year's Copa América, which Uruguay won with a lone goal scored by Cristian Rodríguez.

References

External links
CONCACAF standings

Group C
2015–16 in Mexican football
2015–16 in Uruguayan football